A Cuba libre, or rum and Coke, is a cocktail made of cola and rum.

Cuba Libre may also refer to:

Film and television
 Cuba Libre (film) or Dreaming of Julia, a 2003 comedy-drama film
 "Cuba Libre" (Law & Order: Criminal Intent), a 2003 episode of Law & Order: Criminal Intent

Literature
 Cuba libre!, a 1999 novel by Régine Deforges
 Cuba Libre (novel), a 1998 novel by Elmore Leonard
 Cuba Libre: Breaking the Chains?, a 1987 book by Peter Marshall

Music
 Cuba Libre (album), a 2011 album by Lasse Stefanz
 "Cuba Libre" (Gloria Estefan song) (1998)
 "Cuba Libre" (Moncho song) (2018)
 "Cuba Libre", a 2000 song by Aqua from Aquarius
 "Cuba Libre", a 1999 song by Gigi D'Agostino from L'Amour Toujours
 "Cuba Libre", a 2006 song by Zucchero from Fly

Other uses
Camp Cuba Libre, a U.S. Army camp in Jacksonville, Florida during the Spanish–American War
 Cuba Libre, a type of cigar made by Nestor Plasencia
 Republic of Cuba (1902–1959), a period in Cuban history

See also
 The Cuba Libre Story, a documentary series on Cuban history